Frank Alvin Silvera (July 24, 1914 – June 11, 1970) was a Jamaican-born American character actor and theatrical director.

Born in Kingston, Jamaica and raised in Boston, Silvera dropped out of law school in 1934 after winning his first stage role. During the 1930s and 1940s, he was active in numerous stage productions on and off Broadway and appeared in radio shows. Silvera made his film debut in 1952. Over the course of his 36-year career, he was cast in a wide variety of ethnic roles in film and television. Silvera also remained active in theatre. Silvera was nominated for a Best Actor Tony Award in 1963 for his role in The Lady of the Camellias. He founded the Theatre of Being, a Los Angeles theatre for black actors, in 1965. At the time of his death he had a recurring role in the NBC Western series The High Chaparral.

Early life
Silvera was born in Kingston, Jamaica, the son of a mixed-race Jamaican mother, Gertrude Bell and Portuguese Jewish father, Alfred Silvera. His family emigrated to the United States when he was six years old, settling in Boston. Silvera became interested in acting and began performing in amateur theatrical groups and at church.

He graduated from English High School of Boston and then studied at Boston University, followed by the Northeastern Law School.

Career
Silvera left Northeastern University Law School in 1934, when he was cast in Paul Green's production of Roll Sweet Chariot. He next joined the New England Repertory Theatre where he appeared in productions of MacBeth, Othello and The Emperor Jones. He also worked at Federal Theatre and with the New Hampshire Repertory Theatre. In 1940, Silvera made his Broadway debut in a small role in Big White Fog. His career was interrupted in 1942, when he enlisted in the United States Navy during World War II. He was assigned to Camp Robert Smalls, where he and Owen Dodson were in charge of entertainment. Silvera directed and acted in radio programs and appeared in USO shows. Honorably discharged at the war's end in 1945, he joined the cast of Anna Lucasta and became a member of the Actors Studio.

In 1952, Silvera made his film debut in the western, The Cimarron Kid. Because of his strongly Latin appearance, he was cast in a variety of ethnic roles in films and television. He was cast as General Huerta in Viva Zapata! which starred Marlon Brando. Silvera also portrayed the role in the stage production, which opened at the Regent Theatre in New York City on February 28, 1952. He appeared in two films directed by Stanley Kubrick, Fear and Desire (1953) and Killer's Kiss (1955).

In August 1955, he appeared on Broadway in a revival of Thornton Wilder's The Skin of Our Teeth, which earned him favorable reviews. In November 1955, he portrayed John Pope Sr., the Italian father of Ben Gazzara and Anthony Franciosa's characters on Broadway in Michael V. Gazzo's A Hatful of Rain (a role portrayed by Lloyd Nolan on-screen), and again was praised by critics.

Silvera made guest appearances in numerous television series, mainly dramas and westerns, including Studio One in Hollywood, Alfred Hitchcock Presents, Bat Masterson, Thriller, Riverboat, The Travels of Jaimie McPheeters, The Untouchables, Gunsmoke, Perry Mason and Bonanza. In 1962 he portrayed Dr. Koslenko in The Twilight Zone episode "Person or Persons Unknown", opposite Richard Long. That year, he also played Minarii, a Polynesian man in the 1962 film Mutiny on the Bounty, again starring Marlon Brando. In 1963, he starred with Dean Martin in movie Toys in the Attic.  Silvera was nominated for a Tony Award for Best Actor in a Play for playing Monsieur Duval in The Lady of the Camellias.

In 1964, Silvera and Vantile Whitfield founded the Theatre of Being, a Los Angeles-based theatre dedicated to providing black actors with non-stereotypical roles. One of their first projects was producing The Amen Corner by African-American writer James Baldwin. Silvera and Whitfield financed the play themselves and with donations from friends. It opened on March 4, 1964, and would gross $200,000 within the year, moving to Broadway in April 1965. Beah Richards won critical acclaim for her performance as the lead.

Silvera continued his career in films and guest star roles on television. In 1965, he appeared as Gaspar, one of the Biblical Magi in the epic film The Greatest Story Ever Told, In 1966, he teamed with Marlon Brando for the third time in the Western The Appaloosa. The next year, he portrayed Nick Sorella in The St. Valentine's Day Massacre, followed by guest roles on Dundee and the Culhane and The Wild Wild West. He appeared as a Mexican bandit in the 1967 Martin Ritt-directed Western classic, Hombre, based on the Elmore Leonard novel. In 1969, Silvera had a supporting role as Goatherd in Che!, and as Lobero in the Zapata Western Guns of the Magnificent Seven.

Silvera was then hired as the first guest director at Fresno State College (FSC), with plans to stage a production of The Tea Concession by Henry J. Kemp-Blair, which reversed the racial positions of black and white in a drama about South Africa. However, he was forced to resign less than two weeks later, caught in the middle of administrative shakeups and the aborted hiring of Marvin X by the Black Studies department. "With this upheaval it seemed to blacks and browns that Silvera was part of the package, part of the hardline takeover (at FSC). There was such a sense of despair and betrayal...they took it out on me," Silvera said to David Hale, theater writer for The Fresno Bee. "It seemed to me they thought I was the agent to smooth things over while the establishment hatched up something else dirty."

At the time of his death, Silvera had a recurring role in the NBC western series The High Chaparral as the Mexican squire, Don Sebastian Montoya. His final film, Valdez Is Coming, was released posthumously, in 1971.

Personal life
Silvera married actress Anna Lillian Quarles in 1942. They met while appearing in a stage production of Stevedore. Quarles was the sister of historian and educator Benjamin Arthur Quarles. They had two children, Frank Jr. and Linda, before divorcing in 1963.

Death
Silvera was killed on June 11, 1970, after accidentally electrocuting himself while repairing a garbage disposal unit in his kitchen sink. He was 55.

Silvera was buried with military honors at Long Island National Cemetery in Farmingdale, New York.

Legacy
In 1973, the Frank Silvera Writers' Workshop Foundation, Inc. was created in honor of Silvera and his efforts to support African-American actors and playwrights.
The organization sponsors promising African-American playwrights. In 2005, the workshop was among 406 New York City arts and social service institutions to receive part of a $20 million grant from the Carnegie Corporation, which was made possible through a donation by New York City mayor, Michael Bloomberg.

Filmography

References

External links 

 
 
 
 
 Frank Silvera Writers' Workshop Foundation, Inc.
 

1914 births
1970 deaths
20th-century American male actors
Accidental deaths by electrocution
Accidental deaths in California
American actors of Jamaican descent
American male film actors
American male stage actors
American male television actors
American people of Spanish-Jewish descent
American theatre directors
Boston University alumni
Burials at Long Island National Cemetery
English High School of Boston alumni
Emigrants from British Jamaica to the United States
Male Western (genre) film actors
Male actors from Boston
Military personnel from Massachusetts
Northeastern University School of Law alumni
People from Kingston, Jamaica
United States Navy officers
United States Navy personnel of World War II
Federal Theatre Project people